Cat Phillips (born 13 October 1991) is an Australian rules footballer, playing for Essendon in the AFL Women's competition. She was recruited by Melbourne as a category B rookie in October 2016. She made her debut in the fifteen point loss to Brisbane at Casey Fields in the opening round of the 2017 season. She played every match in her debut season to finish with seven games.

Melbourne signed Phillips for the 2018 season during the trade period in May 2017.

In April 2019, Phillips joined expansion club St Kilda, and in January 2020 she was named an inaugural co-captain of the club. It was revealed Phillips had signed on with the Saints for one more year on 30 June 2021, tying her to the club until the end of the 2021/2022 season.

In May 2022, Phillips joined expansion club Essendon.

Phillips has also represented Australia in international competition in ultimate.

References

External links 

1991 births
Living people
Melbourne Football Club (AFLW) players
Ultimate (sport) players
Australian rules footballers from Victoria (Australia)
Melbourne University Football Club (VFLW) players
St Kilda Football Club (AFLW) players
20th-century Australian women
21st-century Australian women
Competitors at the 2013 World Games
Competitors at the 2017 World Games
Competitors at the 2022 World Games
World Games silver medalists